Pennington Lake is a lake in Kanabec County, in the U.S. state of Minnesota.

Pennington Lake was named for James Pennington, a pioneer farmer.

See also
List of lakes in Minnesota

References

Lakes of Minnesota
Lakes of Kanabec County, Minnesota